Boothby Graffoe In No Particular Order was comedy radio programme that aired from March 2004 to August 2005.  There were 12 half-hour episodes and it was broadcast on BBC Radio 4.  It starred Boothby Graffoe, Stephen Frost, and Debra Stephenson.

References
Lavalie, John. "Boothby Graffoe In No Particular Order." EpGuides. 21 Jul 2005. 29 Jul 2005  <https://web.archive.org/web/20071011212457/http://epguides.com/BoothbyGraffoeInNoParticularOrder/%3E.

External links

BBC Radio comedy programmes
BBC Radio 4 programmes